Janjucetus is an extinct genus of cetacean, and a basal baleen whale (Mysticeti), from the Late Oligocene around 25 million years ago (mya) off southeast Australia, containing one species J. hunderi. Unlike modern mysticetes, it possessed large teeth for gripping and shredding prey, and lacked baleen, and so was likely to have been a predator that captured large single prey animals rather than filter feeding. However, its teeth may have interlocked, much like those of the modern-day filter-feeding crabeater seal (Lobodon carcinophaga), which would have allowed some filter-feeding behavior. Its hunting behaviour was probably similar to the modern-day leopard seal (Hydrurga leptonyx), probably eating large fish. Like baleen whales, Janjucetus could not echolocate; however, it did have unusually large eyes, and so probably had an acute sense of vision. The only specimen was found on the Jan Juc beach, where the remains of the extinct whales Mammalodon, Prosqualodon and Waipatia have also been discovered.

Discovery and naming

The only known fossil of Janjucetus was found in Australia in the late 1990s by a teenaged surfer named Staumn Hunder, near the Victorian township of Jan Juc, in marine sediment that was deposited 27–23.9 million years ago (mya) in the Late Oligocene. The name Janjucetus hunderi honours both the township and the discoverer. Hunder is said to have seen the brown fossils on a boulder while he surfed. Soon after discovering the site, Hunder and his father removed the boulder and transported it to Monash University for further research. The well-preserved fossil remains, specimen NMV P216929, include a nearly complete skull, mandibles, vertebrae, ribs, scapulae and a radius, and are held in the Museums Victoria Palaeontology Collection in Melbourne. It was formally described by Erich Fitzgerald in 2006, and it represents the most complete Paleogene cetacean fossil from Australia.

Description

The snout was broad and triangular, and was not flattened or elongated like those of modern baleen whales. The upper jaw (maxilla) made up around 79% of the snout. The two-halves of the lower jaw were fused (mandibular symphysis), as opposed to the flexible mandibular symphysis of modern baleen whales which allows them to significantly increase the size of their mouth. Compared to archaeocetes, primitive whales, the snout is wider, which may have been a precursor to the large mouths of modern baleen whales. Like other baleen whales, Janjucetus did not possess the ability to echolocate; however, it may have had a large line of fat along its lower jaw, similar to modern toothed whales (Odontoceti), which would mean it could detect ultrasonic signals. It had unusually large eyes for baleen whales compared to its body size, which were positioned high up on the skull; likewise, it probably relied on good eyesight instead of echolocation to navigate.

Janjucetus did not have baleen, and instead had large teeth. The incisors and canines formed a row of conical stabbing teeth, while the premolars and molars were shaped like serrated blades. The teeth were deeply rooted, and the cheek teeth had two roots, perhaps adaptations for handling large prey. The teeth decreased in size towards the back of the mouth. It had sizable temporalis muscles, indicated by their location on the top of the head, meaning it had a strong bite. It had four or six incisor teeth, two canine teeth, eight premolars, and four or six molars in the upper jaw. The teeth had heavily-ridged enamel, and upper teeth were more widely spaced apart than the lower teeth. These teeth perhaps showcase how highly specialised Janjucetus was to its niche, or indicate that it was an evolutionary dead-end given the later proliferation of baleen-bearing baleen whales.

Classification

Janjucetus is considered to be a baleen whale (Mysticeti), despite not having baleen, due to key synapomorphies of the skull anatomy, for example in the way the nasal bones meet the bones of the braincase. Janjucetus is one of two genera, along with the extinct Mammalodon which is also from southeastern Australia, in the family Mammalodontidae. Janjucetus was initially assigned to its own monotypic family, Janjucetidae, but a subsequent cladistic analysis by Fitzgerald in 2010 reassigned it to the Mammalodontidae, making Janjucetidae a junior synonym. Janjucetus is one of the six toothed baleen whales of the Oligocene, the other being M. colliveri, M. hakataramea, Chonecetus, Aetiocetus and Llanocetus.

Palaeoecology

Unlike other baleen whales, Janjucetus did not use baleen to filter feed, and instead used teeth to catch large prey such as fish and sharks. Its skull morphology seems to be convergent with the modern-day leopard seal (Hydrurga leptonyx), and so it may have used a similar grip-and-tear feeding method.

However, it is possible that the front teeth interlocked, and the cheek teeth sheared against each other when the mouth was closed, which perhaps allowed the whale to filter feed similar to the modern day crabeater seal (Lobodon carcinophaga). This may have been a precursor to the evolution of baleen and associated feeding habits. The head of Janjucetus is similar to the wide and blunt heads of modern-day, suction-feeding toothed whales, indicating it could suction feed.

Palaeobiology
Jan Juc Beach, where Janjucetus was discovered, also has yielded some fragmentary vertebrate species, such as sharks, rays and teleost fish. A couple unidentified bird fossils have been found. Other than Mammalodon, the other cetacean remains found there were those of Prosqualodon and Waipatia.

References

External links

National Geographic News

Baleen whales
Oligocene cetaceans
Prehistoric cetacean genera
Fossil taxa described in 2006
Oligocene mammals of Australia